Les Pierres bleues du désert (English: The Blue Stones of the Desert) is a short film written and directed by French-Moroccan Nabil Ayouch in 1992. It was shot in the Moroccan region of Tafraout and featured a then unknown teenage Jamel Debbouze.

Synopsis 
In a remote village in Morocco. Najib, 14 years old, is convinced that there are blue stones in the desert, whose vision has haunted him for years. Taken for a madman by his friends, he also faces the incomprehension of his family. Only the old sheikh believes in his story. One day, the council meets to decide on his case.

References 

1992 short films
1990s French-language films
Moroccan short films